Kavyamata, also referred to as Usanas, is a consort of the rishi Bhrigu In Hinduism. She is the mother of Shukra, the god of the planet Venus and the preceptor of the asuras. She is beheaded by the preserver deity, Vishnu, for protecting the asuras.

Legend
The goddess-centric Devi Bhagavata Purana discusses the legend of this character. Once, the asuras fought a war against the devas and were severely beaten. The asuras rushed to the hermitage of Shukra, while being chased by Vishnu and the devas. None of the men were not present at the hermitage when asuras arrived; Shukra and his father were at work. Kavyamata sent all the devas into a state of deep sleep. By her meditative power, Kavyamata petrified Indra, the king of the devas, paralysing them.  Vishnu summoned his discus weapon — the Sudarshana Chakra, which sliced off Kavyamata's head. Shukra's father, the great sage Bhrigu, was angered when he returned to his hermitage, and cursed Vishnu for his sin of woman-slaughter, saying that Vishnu would have to take numerous avatars on earth to suffer for this act. Bhrigu resurrected Kavyamata by sprinkling holy water from his kamandalu (water-pot). Kavyamata awoke as if from a deep sleep.

Woman-slaughter
Although woman-slaughter is considered as adharma in Hinduism, in the great epic Ramayana, the god Rama – an avatar of Vishnu – is convinced by his guru Vishvamitra that killing the yakshini Taraka is according to dharma. To convince his pupil, the sage gives the example of Kavyamata, who was plotting to "appropriate herself to the dominion of Indra" and was killed by Vishnu, implying that treacherous and wicked persons could be punished as per the dharma of the king, regardless of gender.

References

External links
 

Characters in Hindu mythology